Chae Bin (born Kim Chae-bin on August 22, 1997) is a South Korean actress. Known as the second Moon Geun-young due to her maturity and consistent acting, Chae first drew viewer's attention for her performance in the television series Kim Su-ro, The Iron King (2010).

Filmography

Film

Television series

Music video

References

External links 
 
 
 
 

1997 births
Living people
South Korean child actresses
South Korean television actresses
South Korean film actresses
Place of birth missing (living people)